Kazimierz Porębski (November 15, 1872 – January 21, 1933) was a Polish career naval officer who rose to the position of admiral within the Imperial Russian Navy and was subsequently the first commander-in-chief of the inter-war Polish Navy.

Biography
Porębski was born in Vilnius, in what was then Vilna Governorate of the Russian Empire, to an ethnic Polish family. He entered the Sea Cadets Corps in Petrograd in 1889 and graduated as a midshipman in 1892.

Russian Navy career
Porębski attended mine warfare school upon being commissioned into the Imperial Russian Navy. Porebski was promoted to lieutenant on April 13, 1897, after his return to Russia, and continued his studies in mine warfare.  

On December 1, 1901, he became the executive officer on the cruiser , whose construction he had been sent to oversee at the Schichau-Werke shipyards in Danzig, Germany. Assigned with Novik to the Russian Pacific Fleet, he was promoted to Captain Lieutenant on April 17, 1905. Novik played an active role in the Russo-Japanese War, especially at the Battle of the Yellow Sea and the Battle of Korsakov. 

After the end of the war, Porębski was promoted to lieutenant commander on December 6, 1906, and was assigned to the Russian Baltic Fleet. He briefly commanded the new cruiser, in 1909. From 1909-1913, Porębski was captain of the minelayer, Yenisei. He was also promoted to the rank of captain on November 26, 1912.

During the early stages of World War I, Porębski was captain of the battleship, with the Russian Black Sea Fleet and was active in combat operations off of Bulgaria. Porębski was promoted to rear admiral on April 19, 1916, and reassigned to command the cruiser squadron of the Black Sea Fleet. He went into the reserves from November 1916, but was recalled in early 1917, and was placed in command of the fortifications guarding the Gulf of Finland.  Porebski then served as head of the Maritime Department for the Northwestern Front.

Polish Naval career
With the Russian Revolution, Porębski was released from service with the Russian Navy and quickly moved to the newly independent Poland, arriving in Warsaw in November 1918. He founded the predecessor of the Maritime and Colonial League, an organization dedicated to the establishment of a Polish Navy with an overseas colonial presence. From 1919, he joined the Department of Maritime Affairs in the Ministry of National Defense, initiating the Polish Merchant Navy and the Polish Naval Academy in 1920. He also was involved in the purchasing of the training sailing-ship "Lwów", and the expansion of the military harbor in Gdynia. 

Porebski also participated in the symbolic Poland's Wedding to the Sea performed by Polish president General Józef Haller in early 1920. During the Polish–Soviet War (February 1919 – March 1921), Porębski commanded naval units on the Vistula River. In 1921, he was granted the rank of vice admiral and served as chairman of Maritime Affairs in the Department of the Navy. However, in 1925, he became embroiled in a political scandal involving the purchase of obsolete naval mines and was forced to resign his post. He retired from public service in 1927. A criminal investigation that was launched against him in 1928 by the Military Prosecutor's Office was eventually discontinued.

Porębski died on January 21, 1933, in Warsaw, after a long illness and was buried in the Powązki Military Cemetery.

Honors
 Order of St. Stanislaus 3rd class, Russia, 1902
 Order of the Red Eagle, 4th class, Prussia, 1902
 Order of St. Anne 3rd class with swords and bow, Russia, 1904
 Order of St. Stanislaus 2nd class with swords, Russia, 1904
 Order of St. George, 4th class, Russia, 1904
Golden Sword of St. George, Russia, 1907
 Order of St. Anne 2nd class, Russia, 1907
 Order of St Vladimir, 4th class, Russia, 1907
Nichan Iftikhar, Ottoman Empire, 1907
 Order of the Crown of Italy, Commander's Cross, Italy, 1908
 Legion of Honor, Commander, France, 1908
 Order of Saints Maurice and Lazarus, Commander, Italy, 1910
 Order of St Vladimir, 3rd class, Russia, 1914
 Order of the Star of Romania, Romania,
 Cross of Valour (Poland), 1920
 Order of Polonia Restituta, Officer’s Cross, Poland, 1920

References

In Polish

Julian Czerwiński, Małgorzata Czerwińska, Maria Babnis, Alfons Jankowski, Jan Sawicki. "Kadry Morskie Rzeczypospolitej. Tom II. Polska Marynarka Wojenna. Część I. Korpus oficerów 1918-1947, Wyd. Wyższa Szkoła Morska, Gdynia 1996, 
Kmdr ppor. mgr Piotr Andrzejewski, kmdr ppor. mgr inż. Zygmunt Białogłowski, kpt. mar. mgr inż. Tomasz Dolny, kmdr por. dr Henryk Karwan, kpt. mar. inż. Janusz Królikowski, kadm. Michał Michalski, kmdr por. dypl. Andrzej Walor. "Przegląd Morski", Wyd. kwiecień 2005, nr 4 / 2005, Redakcja Czasopism Marynarki Wojennej, Gdynia 2005, ISSN 0137-7205

In Russian
Page from Russo Japanese war

1872 births
1933 deaths
Military personnel from Vilnius
Polish Navy admirals
Burials at Powązki Military Cemetery
Imperial Russian Navy admirals
Russian military personnel of the Russo-Japanese War
Recipients of the Order of Saint Stanislaus (Russian), 2nd class
Recipients of the Order of St. Anna, 2nd class
Recipients of the Order of St. Vladimir, 3rd class
Recipients of the Gold Sword for Bravery
Commandeurs of the Légion d'honneur
Commanders of the Order of Saints Maurice and Lazarus
Officers of the Order of Polonia Restituta
Recipients of the Order of the Star of Romania
Recipients of the Cross of Valour (Poland)
Naval Cadet Corps alumni